Clavagellidae is a family of very unusual marine bivalves of the order Anomalodesmata.

Genera and species
 †Ascaulocardium Pojeta and N. F 1987
 Brechites Guettard 1770 
 Brechites attrahens
 Brechites brechites
 Brechites dichotomus
 Brechites giganteus
 Brechites javanus
 Brechites penis (Linnaeus, 1758)
 Brechites philippinensis (Chenu, 1842)
 Brechites pulchrum
 Brechites pyriformis 
 Brechites radix (Gray, 1858)   
 Brechites ramosus
 Brechites sparsus
 Brechites strangulatus
 Brechites vaginiferus (Lamarck, 1818)
 Brechites veitchi
 Clavagella Blainville 1817
 Humphreyia Gray 1858
 Penicillus Bruguière 1789
 †Stirpulina Stoliczka 1870

References 

 S Peter Dance, Shells Dorling Kindersley Ltd, London 1992 
 Brechites species

External links 

 
Bivalve families
Taxa named by Alcide d'Orbigny
Extant Campanian first appearances